Sunkist (also marketed as Sunkist Soda) is a brand of primarily orange flavored soft drinks that launched in 1979. Sunkist primarily competes with The Coca-Cola Company's Fanta brand.

History
Sunkist was first licensed by Sunkist Growers to the General Cinema Corporation,  the leading independent bottler of Pepsi-Cola products at the time. The soft drink was the idea of Mark Stevens, who foresaw the potential based on market research which indicated that, worldwide, orange was the third best selling soft drink flavor (largely due to Fanta).

After extensive R&D during 1977 and early 1978, in which research was conducted on taste, color and carbonation levels, Sunkist made a grand introduction in New York by franchising it to The Coca-Cola Bottling Company of New York City, where Edward F. O'Reilly was president. At the time of introduction, Sunkist Soft Drinks had only five key employees: Mark Stevens, President; Peter Murphy, VP Sales; Dr. John Leffingwell, VP R&D; Ray Sissom, VP Finance; and Jim DeDreu, NE Regional Manager. It went national soon thereafter by being franchised mainly to leading Coca-Cola and Pepsi-Cola bottlers. The advertising slogan was "fun, sun and the beach" using TV and radio commercials with the Beach Boys' hit song "Good Vibrations" as the brand's theme. In 1980, Sunkist Orange Soda became the #1 orange soda in the US and the 10th best selling soft drink.  Unlike many other competing orange sodas, Sunkist contains caffeine (19 mg per 12 fl oz). In 2010, there was a consumer recall after a batch was accidentally mixed with 6 times the amount of caffeine, sickening consumers.

In late 1984, Sunkist Soft Drinks was sold to Del Monte. From late 1986 until 2008, it was produced by Cadbury Schweppes under license through its Cadbury Schweppes Americas Beverages subsidiary.  Following the demerger of Cadbury Schweppes Americas Beverages from Cadbury Schweppes, it is now produced by Keurig Dr Pepper in the US. Sunkist is still the most popular orange soda in the United States.  Sunkist (as a carbonated soft drink) is sold in the UK by Vimto Soft Drinks under license from Sunkist Growers. It is also sold in Australia by Schweppes Australia (a subsidiary of Asahi Breweries), but the Australian formulation is caffeine free. In Canada, a caffeine free version of the orange drink is marketed as C'Plus. The package indicates that there is a small amount of Sunkist Juice.

In the Philippines, it was sold by Cosmos Bottling until 2001, when San Miguel Corporation acquired Cosmos and sold its brands to Coca-Cola Bottlers Philippines, Inc. As of 2013, Sunkist is sold by Asia Brewery.
Keurig Dr Pepper makes a variety of Sunkist flavors. In addition to Orange, there is Diet Orange, Grape, Strawberry, Cherry Limeade, Pineapple, Lemonade, Diet Lemonade, Peach, Fruit Punch, Pink Lemonade, Strawberry Lemonade, Berry Lemonade, and Orange Mango.

Slogans 
"Good Vibrations." (1978–early 1980s, 2018–2020)
"Drinkin' in the Sun." (late 1980s)
"Feel All Orange Inside." (2007–2010)
"Head For the Sun." (2010–2013)
"Taste the Sun." (2013–2016)
"Drink the Sun." (2016–2018)
”Run in to the Sun.” (2020–present)

Notes

Further reading
 Pruitt, Bettye H. (1994) “The Making of Harcourt General” Harvard Business School Press, pp. 106–107, 153, 173. . Google Book Search. Retrieved on March 28, 2008. Note – the individual mentioned as Mark Sobell is also known as Mark Stevens.
 1984 Sunkist Ad featuring the "Good Vibrations" theme song, YouTube video ""  Retrieved on March 27, 2008.
 1984-85 Sunkist Ad featuring the "Good Vibrations" theme song, YouTube video ""  Retrieved on May 12, 2008.
 Cadbury Schweppes purchases Canada Dry and Sunkist soft drinks from RJR (July 1986), New York Times (online) "" Retrieved on March 27, 2008.
 Sunkist Soda - History
 Sunkist Soda - Products
Sunkist Soda Montage — In-the-Beginning, YouTube video "" Retrieved on August 12, 2011.

External links 
 
 Beverage World — State of the Industry '06 
 Beverage World — State of the Industry '07 
 Beverage World — State of the Industry '08 
 Beverage World — State of the Industry '09 
 Beverage World — State of the Industry '10 
 Beverage World — State of the Industry '11 
 Sunkist Display Contest
 1989 UK Sunkist Ad, YouTube video ""  Retrieved on May 28, 2008.

Products introduced in 1979
Keurig Dr Pepper brands
Orange sodas